Wilfred "Wilf" Mott is a recurring fictional character in the British science fiction television series Doctor Who, played by Bernard Cribbins. He is the grandfather of the Tenth Doctor's companion Donna Noble, and father of her mother, Sylvia Noble. As companion to the Doctor, an alien Time Lord from the planet Gallifrey, Donna travelled through space and time in the show's 2008 series, having numerous adventures. A believer in extraterrestrial life himself, Wilfred was proud of his granddaughter's adventures and helped to keep them a secret from her overbearing mother. He later became the Tenth Doctor's final companion in "The End of Time".

Cribbins was originally intended to appear only in the 2007 Christmas special, "Voyage of the Damned", but when Howard Attfield was forced to retire from his role as Donna's father, Geoff Noble, due to illness (Attfield subsequently died), creator Russell T Davies reconceived Cribbins' role as Donna's grandfather and replaced Attfield with him for the fourth series. In May 2022, Cribbins was reportedly due to reprise the role for the series' 60th anniversary special in 2023, having been spotted on the set of the special. This will mark the final appearance of Mott and Cribbins's final acting role after the actor died on 27 July 2022.

Character history
Wilfred Mott first appears in "Voyage of the Damned" (2007). The Doctor and Astrid Peth meet him shortly after teleporting down to Earth. He mans a newspaper stand, and is one of the few people to remain in London over Christmas following the bizarre events during each Christmas in recent years ("The Christmas Invasion" and "The Runaway Bride"). He is a staunch monarchist. He witnesses the Doctor and Astrid being teleported back to the intergalactic cruiser Titanic.

Donna Noble calls him "Gramps". In the episode "Partners in Crime", Wilfred is revealed to be an amateur astronomer who spends his evenings stargazing with his telescope from an allotment. He has an interest in alien conspiracies, and is somewhat eccentric in his beliefs. He has a good relationship with his granddaughter who joins him on the allotment when she wishes to escape her mother's nagging. Donna asks him to tell her if he ever sees "a little blue box" and vaguely describes the Doctor to him. After Donna joins the Doctor, the pair make a fly-by of the allotment in the TARDIS, its door open, which astonishes Wilfred. Donna waves to him from the TARDIS door and he is elated to see that she is following her desire for adventure. Wilfred wears on his hat the badge of the Parachute Regiment, in which Cribbins served during his National Service.

In "The Sontaran Strategem", Wilfred is reunited with his granddaughter and the Doctor, whom (Donna is shocked to learn) he has met previously. His absence in "The Runaway Bride" is explained by him being ill with what he believed to be Spanish flu. When the ATMOS devices activate, he is trapped in the family car where the Doctor and Donna try to rescue him; the episode ends with him still trapped and choking in his car. In "The Poison Sky", Sylvia saves him by smashing the windscreen with an axe kept by the front door of her house.

In a parallel world in "Turn Left", in which the Doctor died without ever meeting Donna, Donna wins a holiday for her family in the country, and Wilfred is thus not at his news stand at Christmas as otherwise depicted in "Voyage of the Damned". Without the Doctor, the interstellar cruiser Titanic crashes into Central London, obliterating the metropolis in a massive nuclear explosion. Following the disaster, the United States pledges much-needed aid to the collapsing United Kingdom, prompting Wilfred to shout "God bless America!", though the anticipated aid is cancelled after millions in the U.S. are killed as a result of Miss Foster's selection of the U.S. as a breeding ground for the Adipose. Wilfred and his family are evacuated to Leeds with countless other refugees. They share an apartment with an Italian immigrant family, who initially annoy the Nobles but who Wilfred quickly befriends. References are made there to his military service: an Italian immigrant friend calls him "my captain" and salutes him as he leaves. Wilfred becomes distressed when his friend is taken to a labour camp when a new far-right government places Britain under martial law, noting, "that's what they called them last time," alluding to Nazi concentration camps during World War II.

In "The Stolen Earth", Wilfred takes it upon himself to fight the Daleks, armed with a paintball gun, reasoning that shooting them in the eyepiece will blind them. The Dalek he attempts to blind dissolves the paint from its eyepiece, and states: "My vision is not impaired". He and Sylvia are rescued from the Dalek by Rose Tyler who destroys the Dalek and returns with them to their home to try to contact the Doctor. Due to Wilfred not owning a webcam, his computer can only provide Rose with one-way communication of former Prime Minister Harriet Jones' video conference with her militia of the Doctor's companions. Wilfred is impressed by Harriet, remarking he voted for her; only for Sylvia to remark he did not. He watches in shock as Harriet is exterminated by the Daleks on the computer.

In "Journey's End" because Donna's memory was wiped, Wilfred sees the Doctor off on her behalf, and promises whenever he looks up at the stars, he'll think of the Doctor, whom he considers a very close friend and almost a family member.  Against Sylvia's claims that Donna was just as good before travelling with the Time Lord, Wilfred stands his ground and compels his daughter to admit that the Doctor made Donna a better person. While he agrees to keep the Doctor a secret, he also promises to keep watch for him in Donna's place in memory of his actions.

Wilfred returns one last time in "The End of Time", in which he has repeated visions of the Master. He then repeatedly meets an unnamed woman and discovers depictions of the TARDIS included in historical art. He searches for and finds the Doctor. The Doctor has come to Earth to find the Master, and Wilfred promptly joins him as a companion, the Doctor tries to stop him but partially because he does not want to deal with his furious daughter. The mysterious woman appears on television to tell Wilfred that he must take arms, prompting him to carry his old service revolver from his service in the British Army. The Doctor begins to suspect that something is keeping Wilfred close to him. They go to Joshua Naismith's mansion, where the Master turns the human race into himself, but Wilfred is protected by the Doctor by placing him inside a chamber shielded from radiation. The Doctor and Wilfred are captured by the Master, but are rescued by two aliens, Addams and Rossiter. Donna, who survived the incident, places a cell phone call to Wilfred which the Master tracks, but she kills her pursuers when a fail-safe mechanism placed by the Doctor to suppress her memories activates. On the alien ship after being rescued, Wilfred tries to convince the Doctor to take his gun and kill the Master but fails. During the following missile attack on their ship, Wilfred gleefully mans a laser cannon to defend the ship. Upon their return to Earth, Wilfred traps himself in the radiation booth again while freeing a technician trapped in there and watches the Doctor's confrontation with the Master and Rassilon.  Afterwards, when the Doctor thinks he is safe, Wilfred fulfills the prophecy that "he will knock four times" by knocking four times on the door to get the Doctor's attention. As the booth is about to be flooded with radiation, the Doctor blames himself for not stopping Wilfred from coming with him, had he known he would die. In order to free Wilfred, the Doctor must sacrifice himself by exposing himself to the radiation instead. Wilfred tells him to go, saying he has lived his life, but the Doctor saves him anyway, telling him "It's my honour." The radiation the Doctor absorbs to save Wilfred forces him to regenerate into his eleventh incarnation. Wilfred felt it's his fault for not listened to the Doctor to stay at home or at the TARDIS or kill the Master himself. He is last seen at Donna's wedding, Wilfred is again visited by the dying Tenth Doctor, who gives him and Sylvia a winning lottery ticket as a wedding present for Donna. The Doctor had purchased the ticket with money borrowed in the past from Wilfred's late son-in-law, Geoff Noble. As the Doctor leaves for the last time, Wilfred tearfully salutes him.

Wilfred will reportedly appear in the series' 2023 60th Anniversary specials.

Production

Wilfred was played by Bernard Cribbins who appeared in the second Doctor Who film, Daleks - Invasion Earth 2150 AD, as companion Special Constable Tom Campbell, a character replacing that of Ian Chesterton from the television serial The Dalek Invasion of Earth on which the film was based. Cribbins was also considered for the fourth Doctor in 1974. In 2006, he became part of the revived series when a photograph of him at a wedding was used in the BBC's tie-in website for "Tooth and Claw". Cribbins also played a rock band manager in the Eighth Doctor radio play "Horror of Glam Rock" broadcast on BBC 7 in 2007.

Cribbins brought elements of his own costume for the role when filming "Voyage of the Damned", such as the hat with the Parachute Regiment badge from his National Service days.

Producer Phil Collinson stated in an interview for SFX that Wilfred Mott will "crop up again in the series several times". Collinson says of Cribbins "it's a great privilege to have him on set, he's wonderful" and "now we’ve got him we’re keeping him! He is brilliant." Wilfred is not "strictly speaking" linked to Series 4's joining thread, but in the commentary for the first episode, it was suggested that his meeting the Doctor in the Christmas special may not have been accidental.

Following Wilfred Mott's appearance in "Voyage of the Damned", the character was reintroduced as a recurring character and it was established that he is Donna Noble's grandfather. The character replaces that of Donna's father, Geoff Noble, played by Howard Attfield in "The Runaway Bride", because Attfield died after filming scenes for "Partners in Crime". Collinson had the idea that Wilfred should be Donna's grandfather after Executive Producer Russell T Davies had decided that a grandfather character should replace the father character after Attfield's death. Davies and fellow Executive Producer Julie Gardner liked the idea, so Davies wrote Wilfred into "Partners in Crime". The character Cribbins portrayed in "Voyage of the Damned" was originally to have been called "Stan", but Davies felt that this was not a suitable name for a recurring character and renamed him "Wilfred". Davies was able to get the credits for "Voyage of the Damned" changed before its broadcast for consistency.

Reception
Laura Pledger of Radio Times named Cribbins the best Doctor Who guest star, writing, "When he wasn't making you smile, Wilfred Mott broke your heart". SFX placed the character at number 13 in a 2009 article listing the 27 things they loved best about the revival of Doctor Who.

References

External links 
 
 Wilfred Mott on BBC's Doctor Who website

Television characters introduced in 2007
Fictional people from London
Fictional World War II veterans
Doctor Who companions
Male characters in television
Recurring characters in Doctor Who